Cold War is a twenty-four episode television documentary series about the Cold War that first aired in 1998. It features interviews and footage of the events that shaped the tense relationships between the Soviet Union and the United States.

The series was produced by Pat Mitchell and Jeremy Isaacs, who had earlier in 1973 produced the World War II documentary series The World at War in a similar style. Ted Turner funded the series as a joint production between the Turner Broadcasting System and the BBC. It was first broadcast on CNN in the United States between September 27, 1998 and April 4, 1999, and BBC Two in the United Kingdom. Writers included Hella Pick, Jeremy Isaacs, Lawrence Freedman, Neal Ascherson, Hugh O'Shaughnessy and Germaine Greer. Kenneth Branagh was the narrator, and Carl Davis (who also collaborated with Isaacs with The World at War) composed the theme music. Each episode would feature historical footage and interviews from both significant figures and others who had witnessed particular events.

After the series was broadcast it was released as a set of twelve (NTSC) or eight (PAL) VHS cassettes.

The series was released on DVD by Warner Home Video on May 8, 2012 in North America. The archival footage has been cropped for widescreen presentation instead of being left in the original format 

The series excluded several Cold War issues and topics, including the Communist takeovers of South Vietnam, Laos, and Cambodia in 1975, the subsequent unification of Vietnam and Vietnamese refugee crisis, the mass killings of Communists in Indonesia in 1965, China after Mao Zedong's passing, from the trial of the Gang of Four to the Tiananmen Square protests of 1989, Bulgaria, Albania, and more details on the Dominican crisis of 1965.

Episodes
Each episode lasts approximately 46 minutes.

VHS vs DVD editions
The VHS version is formatted with 4:3 aspect ratio, common for CRT television sets. The interviews are cropped on the sides to fit television screen.

The DVD version is formatted with 16:9 aspect ratio, suitable for widescreen television sets. The archival film is cropped on top and bottom to achieve wider aspect ratio.

Further reading
 Lowinsky, Benjamin D. "The CNN Series on the Cold War: History as Narrative and Entertainment" (Review). Left History, Vol. 6, No. 1, March 1998, pp. 101–107. .
Beichman, Arnold, ed. CNN's Cold War Documentary: Issues and Controversy. Hoover Institution, 2000.

References

External links
CNN official website for the series (2014 version)
 CNN official website for the series (original 1998 version, archived by the Wayback Machine)
 The Cold War over CNN's Cold War, Richard Pipes, Robert Conquest and John Lewis Gaddis debate the accuracy of the series in this Hoover Institute publication.
 
 All episodes at the Internet Archive
 Extended interviews at the National Security Archive.

American documentary television series
American military television series
1990s American documentary television series
1998 American television series debuts
1998 British television series debuts
1998 American television series endings
1998 British television series endings
1990s British documentary television series
Documentary films about the Cold War
Documentary television series about the Cold War
English-language television shows